HMS Hind was a 28-gun sixth-rate frigate of the Royal Navy.

Design

The ship was a revival of the Coventry class, designed in 1756 by Sir Thomas Slade as a development of his  of 1748, "with such alterations as may tend to the better stowing of men and carrying for guns." The design was slightly modified for the Hind and its projected sistership Laurel (which was cancelled after the builder went bankrupt).

Career
After launch, Hind was completed at Deptford Dockyard from 1785 until 24 November 1787 but was not commissioned until May 1790, when she went into service under the command of Captain Alexander Cochrane until 1793.  The captain's nephew, Thomas Cochrane saw his first sea service under his uncle's captaincy.

French Revolutionary Wars
 captured the French privateer Espoir, of ten guns, on 2 March 1793. By agreement, Crescent shared the bounty bill with Hind.

Under Cochrane, Hind captured a number of vessels in 1793:
Merchant vessels: Superb, from Guadaloupe for Havre, and Jeune Charlotte, from Toulon for Brest.
Privateers: Egalite (8 guns; April), Aimiable Marie (10 guns; March), Custein (or Custine; February), Taquin (or Tarquin; 16 guns; April), Georgette (May), and Liberté (12 guns; April)
Recaptured British vessels: Paspebiac, and the sloop Mary.

Georgette was under the command of Jean-Pierre Edet. She came from Nantes and was of 300 tons (French; "of load"). She was armed with sixteen 4 and 6-pounder guns, and had a crew of 120 men. She had captured a small brig before Hind captured her.

In 1794 Hind was commanded by Captain Philip Durham, in 1795 Captain Philip Lee, and in 1796 Captain John Bazely.  In June 1797 command passed to Captain Joseph Larcom, who remained with her until she paid off from service following the Peace of Amiens. While Larcom was in command, Hind captured the Spanish privateer Aimable Juana on 23 April 1798.

Favori had been launched in New England in 1778, and was disguised as an American vessel before she was captured.

Napoleonic Wars
She was refitted at Frindsbury in 1804–1805, and recommissioned at Chatham in June 1805 under Captain Francis Fane for Mediterranean service. In April 1808 command passed to Captain Richard Vincent, then in 1809 Captain John Lumley.

Hind captured the privateer Téméraire, of two guns and 30 men on 29 September 1809 off Milazzo. She was four days out of Naples and had not made any captures.

In 1810 Captain Spelman Swaine replaced Lumley.

Fate
She was taken to pieces at Deptford in July 1811.

Notes

Citations

References
  
 Robert Gardiner, The First Frigates, Conway Maritime Press, London 1992. .
 
 David Lyon, The Sailing Navy List, Conway Maritime Press, London 1993. .

External links
 Ships of the Old Navy

1785 ships
Sixth-rate frigates of the Royal Navy
Ships built in Kent